Adreon Denson Henry (born November 12, 1975) is an artist/musician that currently resides in Austin, Texas.  Over the last seven years he has produced hundreds of paintings and shown work in over thirty exhibits (national and international). He has participated in various art and music residencies and produced an assortment of designs commissioned by international companies.

Henry's band, the trio known as Single Frame, has performed at the SXSW music festival.

Education
Creative Advertising, University of Texas at Austin, B.S., 2002

References

External links
 adreonhenry.com
 Artshow at Volcom Store Hossegor France
 Interview on Austinist.com

1975 births
Living people
20th-century American painters
American male painters
21st-century American painters
20th-century American male artists